Allen Park High School  is a secondary school in Allen Park, Michigan, United States. It is operated by Allen Park Public Schools.  Allen Park High was established in 1950.  Prior to then, Allen Park School District students attended Detroit Southwestern High School, Lincoln Park High School or Melvindale High School.

Notable alumni
 Glenn Gulliver, former MLB player
 Peter McWilliams, writer, activist
 Tom Tresh, former MLB player (New York Yankees, Detroit Tigers) 
 John Varvatos, fashion designer and television personality

Notable faculty
 Glenn Gulliver, former MLB player; baseball coach at school
 Cory Schlesinger,  Football player

References

External links
 Allen Park High School official school home page

Schools in Wayne County, Michigan
Public high schools in Michigan
1947 establishments in Michigan
Educational institutions established in 1947